Arthur Legat (1 November 1898 – 23 February 1960) was a Belgian racing driver.  He participated in two Formula One World Championship Grands Prix, debuting on 22 June 1952.  He scored no championship points.

Legat won the Grand Prix des Frontières at Chimay in 1931 and 1932 with a Bugatti.

Complete Formula One World Championship results
(key)

References

1898 births
1960 deaths
Belgian racing drivers
Belgian Formula One drivers
Grand Prix drivers
Sportspeople from Hainaut (province)
20th-century Belgian people